A – B – C – D – E – F – G – H – I – J – K – L – M – N – O – P – Q – R – S – T – U – V – W – XYZ

This is a list of rivers in the United States that have names starting with the letters X, Y and Z.  For the main page, which includes links to listings by state, see List of rivers in the United States.

Y  
Yaak River – Montana, British Columbia
Yachats River – Oregon
Yadkin River – North Carolina
Yahara River – Wisconsin
Yakima River – Washington
Yalobusha River – Mississippi
Yamhill River – Oregon
Yampa River – Colorado
Yantic River – Connecticut
Yaquina River – Oregon
Yazoo River – Mississippi
Yellow Creek – Illinois
Yellow River – Alabama, Florida
Yellow River – Indiana
Yellow River – Iowa
Yellow River – Wisconsin (Chippewa River tributary)
Yellow River – Wisconsin (Red Cedar River tributary)
Yellow River – Wisconsin (St. Croix River tributary)
Yellow River – Wisconsin (Wisconsin River tributary)
Yellow Bank River – South Dakota, Minnesota
Yellow Dog River – Michigan
Yellow Medicine River – Minnesota
Yellowstone River – Wyoming, Montana, North Dakota
Yentna River – Alaska
Yeocomico River – Virginia
Yockanookany River – Mississippi
Yocona River – Mississippi
York River – Maine
York River – Virginia
Youghiogheny River – West Virginia, Maryland, Pennsylvania
Youngs River – Oregon
Yuba River – California
Yukon River – Alaska

Z 
Zealand River – New Hampshire
Zigzag River – Oregon
Zumbro River – Minnesota
Zuni River – New Mexico, Arizona,

X